Tim or Timothy Graham may refer to:

 Tim Graham (sports journalist), American sports journalist
 Tim Graham (TV producer) (1958–2015), British journalist, television presenter and producer
 Tim Graham (athlete) (born 1939), British sprinter
 Tim Graham (actor) (1904–1979), American actor
 Tim Graham (Home and Away), a fictional character from the Australian soap opera Home and Away
 Tim Graham, director of media analysis at the Media Research Center